The 747 Supertanker was one of several aerial firefighting airtankers derived from various Boeing 747 models. They were the largest aerial firefighting aircraft in the world.

Initially developed by Evergreen International Aviation, the first Supertanker was based on a 747-200 (N470EV, tanker/tail number 947), but never entered service. The second Supertanker (N479EV, tanker/tail number 979) was based on a 747-100 originally manufactured by Boeing in 1971 for Delta Air Lines.  It entered service for the first time in 2009, fighting a fire in Cuenca, Spain, and made its first American operation on August 31, 2009 at the Oak Glen Fire in California. It is no longer in service. 

The third 747 Supertanker was developed by Global Supertanker Services (which acquired most of Evergreen's assets), who owns and operates the aircraft currently. The Global Supertanker (N744ST, tanker/tail number 944) is a Boeing 747-400 dubbed the Spirit of John Muir. It was certified for firefighting flights by the Federal Aviation Administration in September 2016 and fought fires in Chile and Israel before being contracted by U.S. officials to fight California wildfires in 2017. It also took part in firefighting in Bolivia in August 2019. It was retired in 2021.

Development

Development started after the 2002 fire season, which saw the fatal crashes of two air tankers in the United States. The accidents, involving a Lockheed C-130 Hercules and a Consolidated PB4Y-2 Privateer, prompted the US Department of Interior to issue an official request for information on next-generation airtankers.

Evergreen proposed to convert up to four of its Boeing 747-200 Freighters into Supertankers. The first converted Boeing 747 (N470EV) made its maiden flight on February 19, 2004.
 
By June 2006, Evergreen had spent $40 million on the project and was waiting for both US Federal Aviation Administration (FAA) certification and an evaluation contract from the US Forest Service.  In October 2006 the FAA issued Evergreen a supplementary type certificate for the "installation and removal" of internal tanks, associated systems and the support structure for the aerial dispersal of liquids.

Design

The Global Supertanker was equipped with a pressurized liquid drop system, which could disperse fire retardant under high pressure or drop retardant at the speed of falling rain. The Supertanker's tank system could be configured for segmented drops, allowing the contents of the tank to be released at multiple intervals while in flight.

A top speed of nearly  allowed it to be almost anywhere in the U.S. in approximately 5 hours and reach most of the world in under 20 hours.

Operation

In late 2009, the aircraft was under a call-when-needed (CWN) contract with California Department of Forestry and Fire Protection (Cal Fire) and was stationed at Sacramento McClellan Airport outside of Sacramento, California.

Regulations allow for five individuals that are not crewmembers to be carried in the upper deck. This area could be used for command and control, mapping, incident monitoring and video/communications operations.

In December 2010, the Supertanker was deployed to Israel to fight the Mount Carmel forest fire. This was carried out along with crew and utilities donated by other international fire agencies. On June 9, 2011 the Supertanker was also deployed to fight the Wallow Fire in the US state of Arizona which was at  burned and uncontained at the time.

Since May 2016, Global SuperTanker has been based in Colorado at the Colorado Springs Airport, chosen in part for its convenient location for quick deployment to the western US and necessary infrastructure for the large and heavy aircraft. Just a few weeks later, the company was awarded a one-year contract from nearby Douglas County to assist with wildfire containment.

In November 2016, the newer N744ST 747-400 Global Supertanker was deployed to Israel to help fight the wildfires raging in the northern port city of Haifa and elsewhere throughout the country.

In January 2017, the Global Supertanker was deployed to Santiago, Chile, to help the local authorities to combat one of the biggest series of wildfires in the country's history. The operation of the aircraft was the initiative of philanthropist Lucy Avilés and her husband Benjamin Walton, who funded the costs.

In September 2017, the Supertanker was contracted by Cal Fire. In December 2017, the plane was leased by Cal Fire during the late-2017 wildfire season with most drops over the Thomas Fire.

In July 2018, the Colorado Division of Fire Prevention and Control signed a CWN contract to use the supertanker over US Forest Service lands. This followed media inquiries earlier in the summer as to why the supertanker wasn't contracted to fight the fires burning in its home state.

In November 2018, the Global SuperTanker was deployed to northern California to assist with the out-of-control Camp Fire in Butte County.

Evergreen financial difficulties

On June 14, 2013, the Supertanker received a call-when-needed contract from the United States Forest Service, despite not being operational. The aircraft was sitting without engines at the boneyard and maintenance facility at Pinal Airpark outside Marana, Arizona, in need of a “C” check and other maintenance, which would cost US$1 million. Evergreen deferred the maintenance because of financial difficulties, planning to have the Supertanker ready in time for the 2014 fire season.

On November 30, 2013, Evergreen effectively shut down operations. In December 2013, Marana Aerospace Solutions proceeded with the sale of the Supertanker, in lieu of rent and other payments that Evergreen had failed to make. An involuntary bankruptcy case was filed against Evergreen later in the month, and then Evergreen itself filed for dissolution under Chapter 7 bankruptcy on December 31, 2013, freezing the sale.

On December 31, 2013, Evergreen International Airlines filed a Chapter 7 petition with the US Bankruptcy Court in Delaware with substantially all assets (including all 747 airframes) subsequently sold to a parts salvage re-seller, Jet Midwest Aviation. On July 12, 2017, tail number 979 was intentionally destroyed for salvage at Pinal Airpark, in Marana, Arizona.

In August 2015, Global SuperTanker Services (the successor to the defunct Evergreen Supertanker Services), purchased all the physical assets and intellectual property related to Evergreen's original Supertanker (except the 747-100 airframe itself) from Jet Midwest. They transplanted the existing sprayer tank system from the 747-100 into the newer Boeing 747-400 (N744ST) airframe.

In 2021, Global SuperTanker Services began facing financial difficulties, and in April 2021, the company shut down. They sold the Supertanker to National Airlines to be converted into a cargo aircraft.

References

External links

 
 Air Charter Service becomes European agent for 747 Supertanker
 Evergreen 747 facts page
 Aviation Week - Evergreen 747 Supertanker Promises to Alter Aerial Firefighting Tenets
 Evergreen International Files for Chapter 7 Bankruptcy

Aerial firefighting aircraft
Boeing 747
2000s United States special-purpose aircraft
Quadjets
Evergreen aircraft

de:Boeing 747#Sonstige Varianten